is a former Japanese football player.

Playing career
Komata was born in Niigata Prefecture on July 15, 1964. After graduating from Osaka University of Commerce, he joined Yamaha Motors (later Júbilo Iwata) in 1987. He played as regular player as defensive midfielder from first season and the club won the champions 1987–88. However his opportunity to play decreased in 1990s. In 1996, he moved to his local club Albireo Niigata (later Albirex Niigata) in Regional Leagues. The club was promoted to Japan Football League from 1998 and he retired end of 1998 season.

Club statistics

References

External links

Júbilo Iwata

1964 births
Living people
Osaka University of Commerce alumni
Association football people from Niigata Prefecture
Japanese footballers
Japan Soccer League players
J1 League players
Japan Football League (1992–1998) players
Júbilo Iwata players
Albirex Niigata players
Association football midfielders